Pomara High School is a secondary school in the coastal area of Bangladesh. The school is situated in Pomara, Rangunia Upazila, Bangladesh. It was founded in 1928.

See also
 List of schools in Bangladesh
Rotary Betagi Union High School

References

High schools in Bangladesh
1928 establishments in India
Educational institutions established in 1928
Schools in Chittagong District